Ademilson Braga Bispo Junior (born 9 January 1994), known as Ademilson, is a Brazilian professional footballer who currently plays for Chinese Super League club Wuhan Three Towns as a forward. He has previously played for São Paulo in his homeland and Yokohama F. Marinos and Gamba Osaka in Japan.

Club career

São Paulo

Ademilson made his debut on 2 February 2012 in a Campeonato Paulista tie against the Guarani. On 22 July 2012, his Campeonato Brasileiro debut, Ademilson scored a goal, against Figueirense, in a game at the Orlando Scarpelli Stadium. His first international goal was scored on August 1, 2012, when São Paulo played against Bahia, in the 2012 Copa Sudamericana.

On April 23, 2014, in the first leg of the second round of the Copa do Brasil, in a 2-1 São Paulo FC loss against CRB, Ademilson scored a beautiful bicycle kick goal.

Yokohama F. Marinos

Ademilson joined J1 League side Yokohama F. Marinos on loan for the 2015 season and scored 8 times in 33 matches to help them to 7th in the overall standings.

Gamba Osaka

He was loaned to another J League side, Gamba Osaka, in 2016, and debuted for them in their 3–1 loss to Sanfrecce Hiroshima in the 2016 Japanese Super Cup on February 20 of that year. He played his first league match for the men in blue and black a week later in a 1-0 home defeat to Kashima Antlers and went on to score 9 league goals in 29 league games and 13 in 40 in all competitions in his first season in Osaka.

He was signed by Gamba permanently on October 10, 2016 for a US$3.15 million fee. His next two years in Osaka were hit by injury as he missed much of the second half of 2017 and the first half of 2018 due to knee problems. As such he found the back of the net just four times in 22 league matches in 2017 before bagging 5 goals in 17 league games in 2018 as Gamba finished 10th and 9th respectively in the final standings.

Style of play

After showing his qualities in several Brazilian youth football competitions, according to himself, Ademilson thought of his style of play as similar to Luís Fabiano, a former colleague of his at São Paulo FC. Both of them know to use physical force, along with their ability and speed. Besides this, for Ademilson, like his idol, he also has the guts to run and fight in order to win a game. From his own words: "I know I have this quality (force) and I work a lot to improve always in everything and I try to improve my physique, to make it one of my stronger points." Despite still being a teenager Ademilson attracted attention from top European football clubs . In June 2013, there was reported interest from Italian giants Milan. According to newspaper Il Sussudiario, his style of play was similar to Cameroonian international Samuel Eto'o.

Career statistics

Club

1 includes Japanese Super Cup appearances.

International goals

Under–17

Honours
São Paulo
 Copa Sudamericana: 2012

Wuhan Three Towns
China League One: 2021

Brazil U-20
 8 Nations International Tournament: 2012
 Toulon Tournament: 2013, 2014

References

External links

FIFA.com

1994 births
Living people
Brazilian footballers
Brazil under-20 international footballers
Brazilian expatriate footballers
Expatriate footballers in Japan
Brazilian expatriate sportspeople in Japan
Brazil youth international footballers
São Paulo FC players
Yokohama F. Marinos players
Gamba Osaka players
Wuhan Three Towns F.C. players
Campeonato Brasileiro Série A players
J1 League players
Association football forwards
People from Cubatão